Cheng Lihua (born April 1965) is a Chinese politician who is the deputy party secretary of Anhui, in office since April 2021.

She was a representative of the 19th National Congress of the Chinese Communist Party and an alternate member of the 19th Central Committee of the Chinese Communist Party. He is an alternate member of the 20th Central Committee of the Chinese Communist Party.

Biography
Cheng was born in Gushi County, Henan, in April 1965. In 1980, she was accepted to Liaoning Finance And Trade College, where she majored in industrial accounting.

After graduating in 1984, Cheng was assigned to Qinghai Provincial Department of Finance, where she was promoted to deputy head in December 2008 and to head in January 2009. She joined the Chinese Communist Party (CCP) in September 1987. She concurrently served as vice governor of Qinghai since January 2013.

In March 2017, Cheng was admitted to member of the Standing Committee of the CCP Tianjin Municipal Committee, the city's top authority. She became secretary of the Education Working Committee in the following month.

Cheng was transferred to Beijing and appointed vice minister of Finance in March 2018.

In April 2021, Cheng was deputy party secretary of Anhui, in addition to serving as president of the Party School.

References

1965 births
Living people
People from Gushi County
Central Party School of the Chinese Communist Party alumni
People's Republic of China politicians from Henan
Chinese Communist Party politicians from Henan
Alternate members of the 19th Central Committee of the Chinese Communist Party
Members of the 20th Central Committee of the Chinese Communist Party